Europe a Nation was a policy developed by the British fascist politician Oswald Mosley as the cornerstone of his Union Movement. It called for the integration of Europe into a single political entity. Although the idea failed to gain widespread support for the Union Movement, it proved highly influential on European far-right thought.

Origins
The idea of a united Europe began to develop in the final days of the Second World War. Concepts such as Nation Europa and Eurafrika, both of which looked for an ever-closer union between European countries, gained some currency in the German far-right underground in the immediate aftermath of the war. Mosley, who towards the end of the war had learned to read the German language, read a number of pamphlets discussing these ideas and was strongly influenced by them. Another important influence was Benito Mussolini's manifesto of the Italian Social Republic, which included a call for the establishment of a European Community.

For his part, Mosley would later claim that he had first advocated something akin to Europe a Nation in speeches as early as 1936. In Mosley's essay The World Alternative published in 1936 he wrote "We must return to the fundamental concept of European union which animated the war generation of 1918," and he proposed "the union of Europe within the universalism of the Modern Movement." It was not, however, British Union of Fascists policy at any time. In Mosley's book Tomorrow We Live published during 1938 he  declared that BUF policy was in favour of a "united Europe" and a "New Europe".

Development
Mosley first presented his idea of Europe forming a single state in his book The Alternative in 1947. He argued that the traditional vision of nationalism that had been followed by the various shades of pre-war fascism had been too narrow in scope and that the post-war era required a new paradigm in which Europe would come together as a single state. He rejected any notion of a federal Europe, instead calling for full integration. Indeed, Mosley insisted that a supranational European state was essential to the plan. The policy was presented to the wider electorate in October 1948 when Mosley called for elections to a European Assembly as the first step towards his vision.

The notion also had an important geopolitical dimension as Mosley saw it as the only defence against Europe becoming the scene of the power struggles between the United States and the Soviet Union in the Cold War. He contended that the racial kinship between the peoples of Northern Europe, whom he defined as the Germans, British, Scandinavians, northern French, West Slavs and East Slavs would be the basis for unity, whilst also declaring his admiration for the contributions of the South European peoples. 

He was opposed to both the United Nations and its predecessor the League of Nations, dismissing both as part of a Jewish plot to undermine nationalism. As such, Europe a Nation was to include an anti-Semitic dimension, with the entire Jewish population of Europe to be expelled to Palestine, where they could decide their own fate.

Africa, most of which was still in the hands of the European colonial empires, was to be retained by the united Europe as a giant colony, with apartheid implemented on a continental basis, effectively excluding Blacks from Europe. Notions of any indigenous rule in Africa were excluded altogether from the idea. With autarky a central aim of Europe a Nation, Africa was to be exploited by the new state for its mineral and food resources. In this aspect, Mosley was heavily influenced by the works of Anton Zischka.

Mosley subsequently built upon the policy by calling for the European state to have its prices and incomes regulated by a "wage price mechanism", whilst also calling for "European Socialism", a syndical style organisation basis for the continent's industry. Effectively though the vision he presented was one that was highly steeped in corporatism and elitism. Elections were to be corporatist in nature with an occupation-based franchise (previously a British Union of Fascists policy) whilst "European Socialism" was to include an effective free hand for business leaders but the co-ordination of workers in bodies called "labour Charters", a policy borrowed from  Fascist Italy.

Mosley summed up the arguments himself by stating that 'no lesser degree of union than that of an integral nation can give the will and power to act on the great scale.... No lesser space than all Europe, and the overseas possessions of Europe in a common pool, can give the room within which to act effectively'. However Europe a Nation drew heavily on the existing heritage of fascism and indeed Graham Macklin has argued that it "merely adapted and enlarged the parameters of his fascist panacea to suit the times, and is thus easily recognisable as 'Fascist'".

Mosley expanded upon his ideas for a single integrated European nation state and a European government in his book Europe: Faith and Plan published in 1958.

Impact
Within the UK, the notion of Europe a Nation largely failed to attract the younger far-right activists, most of whom deserted Mosley in favour of the League of Empire Loyalists (LEL) and other more minor and more extreme groups. A.K. Chesterton, who went on to lead the LEL, was a strong critic of Europe a Nation from 1947 when The Alternative was first published, preferring to emphasise British nationalism.

The policy also failed to capture the minds of the British electorate, with the Union Movement enjoying comparative success in voting terms only when they emphasised more basic anti-immigrant rhetoric. Even Alexander Raven Thomson, one of Mosley's closest lieutenants and noted for his sycophantic attitudes towards his leader, eventually told Mosley in 1950 that Europe a Nation held little attraction to British voters. As a consequence, the Union Movement briefly downplayed the idea, although Thomson's preferred alternative, neo-Nazism, was soon abandoned as well when it proved equally unpalatable to the electorate.

Within the wider European far-right, however, Europe a Nation did gain some wider currency. Fritz Rössler, at the time going by the alias Dr. Franz Richter, became an enthusiastic supporter of the idea and attempted to make it Deutsche Reichspartei policy. He failed in this attempt and was expelled from the party, decamping to the Socialist Reich Party instead. For a time it also had the support of Adolf von Thadden, who helped Mosley to organise the National Party of Europe, a largely failed attempt to build a continental Europe a Nation political party. Ultimately however the plan's main supporter in Germany proved to be Arthur Erhardt, who established the journal Nation Europa to support far-right pan-European nationalist ideas, to which Mosley was a frequent contributor.

Outside Germany it also gained some currency within the Italian Social Movement, although by the early 1950s that wing of the party lost influence, the Italian nationalist arm gaining supremacy. Similar ideas would later be developed by Jean-François Thiriart and others interested in Europeanism whilst Europe a Nation was also an important influence on the thinking of Alain de Benoist and in particular the work of the think tank Groupement de recherche et d'études pour la civilisation européenne which he established in 1968.

See also
The European
Fourth Reich
National Party of Europe
Pan-European identity
European Union
Pan-European nationalism
Pan-nationalism
United States of Europe

Notes

References
Harris, Geoffrey, The Dark Side of Europe: The Extreme Right Today, Edinburgh University Press, 1994
Macklin, Graham, Very Deeply Dyed in Black: Sir Oswald Mosley and the Resurrection of British Fascism After 1945, I.B. Tauris, 2007
Thurlow, Richard, Fascism in Britain: A History, 1918-1985, Basil Blackwell, 1987

External links
Europe a Nation section of oswaldmosley.com
In support of a National Party for Europe

Politics of Europe
Neo-Nazi concepts
Fascism in the United Kingdom
Pan-European nationalism
Far-right politics in Germany
Oswald Mosley